Annick Lefebvre (born Maurice on September 19th   1965 at Metz) is a former French athlete who specialised in the shot put.

Biography  
Annick won nine French national titles in the shot put,  5 outdoor in 1990, 1991, 1992, 1994 and 1995, and 4 indoors in 1990, 1991, 1992 and 1994.

prize list  
 French Championships in Athletics   :  
 5 times winner of the shot put in 1990,  1991,  1992,  1994 and 1995.   
 French Indoor Athletics Championships :  
 4 times winner of the shot put in 1990, 1991, 1992 and 1994

Records

notes and references  
 Docathlé2003, Fédération française d'athlétisme, 2003, p. 420

1965 births
Living people
Sportspeople from Metz